Regional Labor Courts are Brazilian appellate courts of the Federal specialized court system for matters of labor law. There currently are 24 Regional Labor Courts, geographically defined by numbered Regions.

References

Labor in Brazil
Judiciary of Brazil
Labour courts
Brazilian labour law
Brazil politics-related lists